Maurice Lennon is an Irish fiddle player and composer. He grew up in a very musical family, the son of the late fiddle player Ben Lennon and nephew of composer/fiddle player/pianist Charlie Lennon. 

He won the senior All-Ireland fiddle title aged 17.

Professionally, he first came to prominence in the popular 1980's band Stockton's Wing for whom he was fiddle player and a composer of some of their popular tunes, including The Golden Stud.

He received Freedom of County Clare with his Stockton's Wing bandmates in 2017.

He was honored as 2011 iBAM Musician of the Year by the Irish American Heritage Centre.

His credentials as a composer were solidified with his 2001 suite Brian Boru The High King of Tara, released by Tara Records. The album was produced by Donal Lunny and includes contributions from Mairtin O'Connor, Anthony Drennan and Mick O'Brien.

In 2013 he released his first solo fiddle album The Little Ones, which contains several of his compositions.

He has lived in Chicago for many years and a benefit concert was held for him at Chicago's Irish American Heritage Center in 2012.

References

Maurice Lennon Composer and Musician 

Year of birth missing (living people)
Living people